= Kiaa1107 =

Protein-coding gene in the species Homo sapiens

KIAA1107

Identifiers
- Aliases: KIAA1107
- External IDs: OMIM: 617945; MGI: 2445097; HomoloGene: 128318; GeneCards: KIAA1107; OMA:KIAA1107 - orthologs
Orthologs
Species	Human	Mouse
Entrez	23285	231570
Ensembl	ENSG00000069712	n/a
UniProt	Q9UPP5	Q80TK0
RefSeq (mRNA)	NM_015237	NM_001007574; NM_001168557
RefSeq (protein)	NP_056052	NP_001007575; NP_001162029
Location (UCSC)	n/a	n/a
PubMed search
- Wikidata
View/Edit Human	View/Edit Mouse

KIAA1107 is a protein that in humans is encoded by the KIAA1107 gene. KIAA1107 is a Serine-rich protein, whose expression was found to increase in white matter of Multiple Sclerosis brain lesions.

== Gene ==
=== General Information ===
KIAA1107 is a protein encoding gene, located on chromosome 1 in Homo sapiens. Its exact location is at cytogenetic band 1p22.1, with the genomic location of 92,067,052 bp - 92,184,723 bp from pter, with 17,672 total bases. The KIAA1107 gene contains nine known exons.

== Protein ==
=== General Properties ===
Uncharacterized Protein KIAA1107 is 1401 amino acids in length in the most common variant, isoform A, found in Homo sapiens. The predicted molecular weight of isoform A in Homo sapiens is 149.6 kdal.

=== Composition ===
KIAA1107 has a higher frequency of Serine and Aspartate and a lower frequency of Tyrosine than in the average protein in Homo sapiens. Uncharacterized protein is composed of 7.5% Aspartate and 14.0% Serine, which constitutes it as a Serine-rich protein. This protein also consists of 0.7% Tyrosine, which is considered to be below average in human proteins.

== mRNA ==
=== Isoforms ===
Transcription of KIAA1107 produces 6 different mRNAs, with 4 alternatively spliced variants and 2 unspliced forms. Variant A is the most commonly occurring and longest variant of KIAA1107 in humans. Variant A contains nine exons (1-9) present in their standard form. Variant B contains seven exons (3-9) present in standard form. Variant C-U contains one exon, which is an alternatively spliced variant of exon 8. Variant D contains five exons (1-4, 5a) with 1-4 occurring in their standard form and an alternative form of exon 5. Variant E contains three exons, which are alternatively spliced forms of exons 3, 4, and 5. Variant F-U contains one exon, which is an alternatively spliced form of exon 5a, which occurs in variant D.

=== Conserved Domains ===
There is a domain, DUF4596, present from 1311 - 1354 in KIAA1107. The function of this domain is unknown.

== Expression ==
=== Tissue Expression ===
Expression of KIAA1107 does not appear to be ubiquitous in Homo sapiens. KIAA1107 is found to be expressed mostly in the brain, with lower levels of expression occurring in the bladder, mammary gland, muscle, prostate, and testis. Within the brain, KIAA1107 is expressed highest in the pineal gland, prefrontal cortex, cingulate cortex, and subthalamic nucleus.

=== Disease Association ===
KIAA1107 was found to be over expressed in brain white matter with Multiple Sclerosis brain lesions when compared to control white matter. The average non-diseased sample had negligible expression of KIAA1107, while in the diseased sample it was expressed higher than almost any other gene (95th-98th percentile of expression).

== Homology ==
=== Orthologs ===
Orthologs of KIAA1107 exist in most vertebrates. The most distant homolog of KIAA1107 was found in, a fish, the Amazon Molly. There were no homologs found for sharks and rays, which would suggest that KIAA1107 originated in fish. There are no human paralogs for KIAA1107.

Genus & Species	Common name	Accession number	Sequence length	Sequence identity	Sequence similarity
Homo sapiens	Human	NP_056052.2	1354	1354/1354 (100%)	1354/1354 (100%)
Pan paniscus	Pygmy Chimpanzee	XP_008958748.1	1559	1336/1354 (99%)	1344/1354 (99%)
Gorilla gorilla gorilla	Gorilla	XP_004026176	1353	1331/1354 (98%)	1340/1354 (98%)
Colobus angolensis palliatus	Angola Colobus	XP_011795361.1	1357	1285/1357 (95%)	1310/1357 (96%)
Mandrillus leucophaeus	Drill	XP_011829848.1	1356	1283/1356 (95%)	1306/1356 (96%)
Orcinus orca	Killer Whale	XP_004263069.1	1352	1111/1355 (82%)	1202/1355 (88%)
Felis catus	Cat	XP_003990349.2	1380	1101/1354(81%)	1195/1354 (88%)
Eptesicus fuscus	Big Brown Bat	XP_008152941.1	1334	1072/1355 (79%)	1176/1355 (86%)
Orycteropus afer afer	Aardvark	XP_007934238.1	1343	1058/1354 (78%)	1170/1354 (86%)
Ornithorhynchus anatinus	Platypus	XP_001507357.2	1366	733/1412 (52%)	929/1412 (65%)
Haliaeetus albicilla	White-Tailed Eagle	KFP95312	1411	731/1397 (67%)	936/1397 (67%)
Gekko japonicus	Schlegel's Japanese Gecko	XP_015276947.1	1779	728/1389 (52%)	922/1389 (66%)
Opisthocomus hoazin	Hoatzin	XP_009939466	1664	721/1398 (52%)	924/1398 (66%)
Nipponia nippon	Crested Ibis	KFR00383.1	1415	720/1398 (52%)	916/1398 (65%)
Fulmarus glacialis	Northern Fulmar	KFW06854	1410	721/1419 (51%)	921/1419 (64%)
Cuculus canorus	Common Cuckoo	KFO69590	1422	705/1422 (50%)	896/1422 (63%)
Anolis carolinensis	Carolina Anole	XP_008107452.1	1755	697/1389 (50%)	872/1389 (62%)
Python bivittatus	Burmese Python	XP_007430940.1	1568	679/1407 (48%)	886/1407 (62%)
Thamnophis sirtalis	Common Garter Snake	XP_013930049.1	1768	671/1390 (48%)	869/1390 (62%)
Xenopus tropicalis	Western Clawed Frog	XP_012617894.1	1530	516/1383 (37%)	738/1383 (53%)
Poecilia formosa	Amazon Molly	XP_007554759.1	1533	274/617 (44%)	351/617 (56%)
Nonothenia coriiceps	Black Rockcod	XP_010771069.1	990	243/592 (41%)	325/592 (54%)
